Nong Om  is a tambon (subdistrict) located in the northernmost area of Thung Si Udom district, in Ubon Ratchathani Province, Thailand. In 2021, it had a population of 5,993 people. Neighbouring subdistricts are (clockwise from the south) Khok Chamrae, Na Hom, Thung Thoeng, Na Krasaeng, and Som Sa-at.

History
The tambon Nong Om was formed in 1969, by splitting off 10 villages in the southeastern region of Thung Thoeng in Det Udom district. Later in 1991, the southwestern region of the tambon, which consisted of eight villages, was cut off to establish a new division, Khok Chamrae. A year after the demarcation, both Nong Om and Khok Chamrae, together with three other subdistricts, including Thung Thoeng, Na Kasem, and Kut Ruea,  were split off from Det Udom district to create a minor district (king amphoe) called Thung Si Udom. However, the inclusion of tambon Thung Thoeng into the new district was undone a year later, on June 1, 1993.

Geography
The tambon is located in the northern region of the Thung Si Udom district, on the undulating land between the low river plains of the Lam Dom Yai River (ลำโดมใหญ่) in the east and of the Huai Khayung Creek (ห้วยขะยุง) in the west.

Administration
The Nong Om subdistrict is divided into nine administrative villages (mubans; หมู่บ้าน), one of which, Nong Om village, was further divided into two community groups (Mu; หมู่). The entire area is governed by the Subdistrict Administrative Organization of Nong Om (องค์การบริหารส่วนตำบลหนองอ้ม; Nong Om SAO).

As of the 2021 census, it had a population of 5,809 people with 1,903 households. The following is a list of the subdistrict's mubans, which roughly correspond to the villages.

References

Tambon of Ubon Ratchathani Province